Cameron Gordon (born June 5, 1991) is a former American football linebacker and current Michigan State Police Trooper. He played college football for Michigan. He signed as an undrafted free agent with the New England Patriots in 2014.

Professional career

New England Patriots
After going unselected in the 2014 NFL draft, Gordon signed with the New England Patriots on May 12, 2014. On August 26, 2014, he was placed on the team's injured reserve.

Gordon won Super Bowl XLIX with the Patriots after they defeated the defending champion Seattle Seahawks, 28-24.

Gordon was waived by the Patriots on August 27, 2015.

Kansas City Chiefs
On January 5, 2016, Gordon signed a futures contract with the Kansas City Chiefs.

Law Enforcement Career
On June 4, 2017, Gordon began recruit training with the Michigan State Police 133rd Trooper Recruit School. Gordon had just been cut by the Kansas City Chiefs and was “team hopping” in the National Football League when he found his second calling. Gordon stated, “I came to the realization that I just wasn’t performing the way that I once was, So I said, ‘What is another career that will allow me to have an impact, have influence on younger kids and also leave behind a positive legacy?’ Instantly, state trooper — law enforcement — jumped into my mind.  On November 30, 2017, Gordon completed Trooper Recruit School training and was assigned to the Michigan State Police Metro South Post.”

References

External links
Career transactions 
New England Patriots bio
Michigan Wolverines bio 

Living people
1991 births
Players of American football from Michigan
American football linebackers
African-American players of American football
Michigan Wolverines football players
People from Inkster, Michigan
New England Patriots players
Kansas City Chiefs players
21st-century African-American sportspeople